Richard Cowe was Archdeacon of Totnes during 1219.

References

Archdeacons of Totnes